Whatì Water Aerodrome  is located on Lac La Martre near Whatì, Northwest Territories, Canada. It is open from mid-June until mid-October.

See also
 Whatì Airport

References

Registered aerodromes in the North Slave Region
Seaplane bases in the Northwest Territories